Oxford Odissi Festival is an annual Indian classical dance festival held at University of Oxford, United Kingdom.

The festival was founded by Indian dancer and choreographer Baisali Mohanty in 2015 and is organised by Oxford Odissi Centre in association with the High Commission of India to the United Kingdom.

Beside exhibiting new and innovative choreographies in Odissi, the festival showcases all forms of Indian classical dance.

History 
The festival was conceptualised by Baisali Mohanty, a master's degree student at University of Oxford and a classical dancer and choreographer, to help popularise Odissi and other forms of Indian classical dance at one of the premier seat of learning.

The first edition of the festival was held on May 27, 2016, at the Grove Auditorium of Magdalen College, University of Oxford.

Festival Programme 
The festival hosts solo, duet and group choreographies. A major attraction of the festival is a fusion featuring Odissi, Kathak, Bharata Natyam and Mohiniyattam, highlighting the interconnectedness that runs through this different dance forms, as a reflection of the underlying unity among diverse Indian culture.

References

External links
https://web.archive.org/web/20160815224843/http://www.southasia.ox.ac.uk/oxford-odissi-festival

Dance festivals in the United Kingdom
Art festivals in the United Kingdom
Annual events in England
Dance in India
Dance events
Odissi
Festivals in Oxford